Blutengel (stylized as BlutEngel) is a German electronic music group formed by singer Chris Pohl (also of the groups Terminal Choice, Tumor, and Miss Construction and the owner of the Fear Section label) after he had to leave Seelenkrank due to contractual and legal problems. The lyrics are written primarily in German and English and are presented with male and female vocals. The themes of the songs usually centre around themes common in Gothic fiction such as love, vampirism, sexual fetishism, death, and immortality. The band calls their musical style dark pop.

History

Formation and early years (1998–2001)
Blutengel was formed in 1998 after Chris Pohl had decided to give up the preceding project, Seelenkrank (which had released two albums), due to contractual problems. Just as its predecessor, Blutengel uses melodious electronic tunes in combination with both male and female voices. The lyrics are primarily in German or English and mixed between male and female vocals paired with electronic sounds and with songs often focusing on all aspects of love, from the tragedy of hopeless romance of vampires (all the way to the more animal aspects of desire) and aspects of death and the afterlife.

The first album Child of Glass was released in early 1999 with Kati Roloff and Nina Bendigkeit as the original female vocalists.

In 2001, the second album Seelenschmerz was released. Nina left to concentrate on photography and eventually form the band Formalin. Gini Martin joined the band as the second female voice alongside Kati. The first Blutengel gig ever took place at the Wave-Gotik-Treffen on 1 June 2001, in Leipzig, in front of 10,000 fans. At the end of 2001, the single Black Roses was released with Constance Rudert as a session singer. The band performed at the Dark Storm Festival where Constance appeared on stage with Kati and Gini. This was the last time the band would play with its original line-up. Kati and Gini left the band days later for personal reasons and founded their own project together, Tristesse de la Lune. Constance, who had originally only been recruited for the single "Black Roses", became a full time member of Blutengel. Eva Pölzing joined soon after as a second vocalist.

Rise in popularity (2002–2008)
Angel Dust was released in 2002, placing 58th on the German Charts. The Angel Dust promotional photo-shoot and booklet was made by Nina Bendigkeit.

In 2004 their fourth album, Demon Kiss, was released, featuring the single "Forever". A DVD release Live Lines and the album-length EP The Oxidising Angel appeared in 2005, the latter of which contained new material as well as a cover of "Cry Little Sister" from The Lost Boys soundtrack. In early October Eva Pölzing decided to leave the band due to other projects. Eva was replaced by Ulrike Goldmann (ex-Say-Y).

For the following two years, the band released a couple of singles with a slightly more "pop-driven" sound until their fifth album, Labyrinth was released in September 2007. It reached 36th in the German charts, and featured the single "Lucifer", and the live favourite "Engelsblut".

Extended albums (2009–2012)
In 2009 Blutengel released the album Schwarzes Eis, which featured the single "Dancing in the Light" and accompanying music video to promote the album. An extended edition of this album contained three full CDs, each with its own subtitle (Schwarzes Eis, the instrumental Behind the Mirror and Redemption). The EP Soultaker was released later that year.

In 2010, they performed at the Amphi Festival featuring Anja Milow, Maria Rehfeld and Jenny Haufe who had been hired in 2009 as a dancers for the Schwarzes Eis Tour. Days later, it was announced on the official website that Constance had been replaced by two new singers, Anja Milow and Steffi Weingarten. Both featured on the seventh album Tränenherz, released in 2011 and placed in the German charts at number 12. Two singles "Über den Horizont" & "Reich Mir Die Hand" were released to promote the album, with accompanying music videos the latter featuring Pohl's new girlfriend Viki Scarlet as the "Bloody Girl" in Reich Mir Die Hand who would later become a permanent dancer.

The EP Nachtbringer followed that same year. a music video was released for the title track featuring the complete lineup excluding Jenny for this video. Steffi was fired from the band before they began touring and on her official Facebook page, she wrote a statement claiming that she was not allowed to tour due to legal issues with Constance.
Jenny left in 2012, followed by Anja to focus on her job as a model for the clothing label AMF Korsets, continue college studies and work as an independent designer with her label Madone Noire.

Monument and Black Symphonies (2012–2014)
From 12 to 20 May 2012 Blutengel toured North America for the first time. Playing in Mexico City, New York, San Antonio, San Francisco, Los Angeles, and in Montreal for the Kinetik Festival. After the tour Maria Rehfeld left the band.

The first single from the album Monument, "Save Our Souls", was released in November 2012 while the second single, "You Walk Away", was released in January 2013. The album Monument was released in February 2013 and placed #4 & #96 on the German and Switzerland music charts respectively. "Kinder dieser Stadt was released on 19 July 2013 as the third single from Monument.

Blutengel released an orchestral compilation album, Black Symphonies (An Orchestral Journey), on 28 February 2014. A single and music video for "Krieger" were released to promote the album.

Omen & Nemesis: The Best of  & Reworked (2014–2016)
The first single "Asche Zu Asche", from their upcoming album was released on 14 November 2014. The second single, "Sing", was released on 23 January 2015.

Omen was released on 12 February 2015.

The band then embarked on the first leg of the Omen tour in April and spanning through to August. Festival appearances include Wave-Gotik-Treffen, Mera Luna Festival, and Summer Breeze Open Air.

A new EP, In Alle Ewigkeit, was announced via the band's website in early August as well as the tour dates for the second leg of the Omen tour, which began in November and ended in early December. The new EP was released 23 October 2015, and featured a reworking of 'Weg Zu Mir' originally from 'Child of Glass' which served as a preview for the upcoming 'Best of' album.

Chris Pohl recorded guest vocals on Italian industrial group Helalyn Flowers' "Beware of Light" single which was released by Belgian label Alfa Matrix Records in October 2015.

On 26 February 2016, their 'best of' album Nemesis: The Best of & Reworked was released with re-recorded versions of BlutEngel classics. To support this release, they will be playing 'Nemesis - Open Air Festival' in July.

Due to legal issues, Omen was re-released under the title Save Us.

Leitbild & Un:Gott (2016–present)
In early 2016, BlutEngel entered the studio to record a new album, set for a release in February 2017.

"Complete", the first single from the upcoming 10th album, Leitbild, was released on 2 December 2016; it featured two B-sides and a remix by British darkwave act Massive Ego. The second single "Lebe Deinen Traum" was released as a digital single on 3 February 2017.

Leitbild was released on 17 February. The album would be the band's third straight album to chart in the top 5 of the Media Control Charts at number 4. The album would also chart Swiss Music Charts at #49. BlutEngel went on Tour starting in April and ended in May to promote Leitbild, with Massive Ego as their support. On 12 May, they performed an acoustic set which was recorded for release on DVD as, A Special Night Out: Live & Acoustic in Berlin.

After the Leitbild tour ended, Chris teased that he began work on a new Mini Album or EP to be released towards the end of the year. The new Mini Album was later confirmed and entitled Black. The 2nd leg of the Leitbild tour was also announced for October-December 2017. Live im Wasserschloss Klaffenbach will be released April 2018, with footage from their 'Nemesis - Open Air Festival' from July 2016.

In May 2018 BlutEngel were back in the studio working on their next album, Un:Gott, which was released 15 February 2019 and was promoted with a tour, that began in February. The tour was once again supported by Massive Ego.

A new Mini Album "Damokles" was released on 1 November 2019.

During the COVID-19 pandemic three singles were released. The first Wir Sind Unsterblich on 27 March. The second, Obscured, a collaboration with Hocico on 3 April. The third, Nothing But A Void, a collaboration with Massive Ego will be released on Friday 13 November.

Line-up

Current members 
 Chris Pohl – vocals, lyrics, programming (1998–present)
 Ulrike Goldmann – vocals and lyrics (2005–present)

Current dancers 
 Viki Scarlet – Main Visual Concept (2011–present)

Former members 
 1998–2000: Nina Bendigkeit (now in Formalin; also female voices on Seelenkrank and Terminal Choice albums) – Vocals and lyrics 
 1998–2002: Kati Roloff (was in Tristesse de la Lune with Gini but left in late 2006) – Vocals
 2000–2002: Gini Martin (now in Tristesse de la Lune) – Vocals and Lyrics 
 2002–2005: Eva Pölzing (now in F.O.D) – Vocals
 2002–2010: Constance Rudert (now in Cinderella Effect)– session singer then Vocals and Visual Concept
 2010–2011: Steffi Weingarten – Vocals
 2009–2012: Anja Milow – Vocals and Visual Concept

Former dancers 
 2001–2009: Sonja Semmler (now in Masters of Comedy) – Live performance, visual concept (their first official dancer/performance artist to be part of the band)
 2009-2012: Jenny Haufe- Visual Concept
 2009-2012: Maria Rehfeld- Visual Concept

Discography

Studio albums 
 1999: Child of Glass
 2001: Seelenschmerz
 2002: Angel Dust
 2004: Demon Kiss
 2007: Labyrinth
 2009: Schwarzes Eis
 2011: Tränenherz
 2013: Monument
 2015: Omen/Save Us
 2017: Leitbild
 2019: Un:Gött
 2021: ''Erlösung - The Victory Of Light

References

External links 
  
 
 Blutengel lyrics at Industrial Lyrics

German dark wave musical groups
German electronic music groups
Metropolis Records artists
Musical groups established in 1998
1998 establishments in Germany